"Je vole" is a 1978 song by French singer Michel Sardou and the title track of the same titled album Je vole by Sardou. The B-side of the single was "8 jours à El Paso". The lyrics of "je vole" were co-written by Michel Sardou and Pierre Billon and the music was composed by Sardou himself. The song was a big commercial success reaching number 3 in France selling approximately 500,000 copies.

Context
The song is a last silent appeal of an adolescent on the verge of committing suicide the same day. This was confirmed in Sardou's autobiography: "je vole is not about an adolescent running away, it's about an adolescent who's about to commit suicide".

The main part of the lyrics is spoken by Sardou as prose, and only the refrain is sung:

Track listing
"Je vole" (5:02)	
"8 jours à El Paso" (3:07)

Charts

In popular culture

Louane Emera's version

The song's subject was adapted for the storyline of the 2014 French film La famille Bélier directed by Éric Lartigau. The story writer Victoria Bedos indicated that she based her story on the song "je vole" as she considered Sardou's songs very inspirational. Since the sentiments in "Je vole" touched her heart deeply, she submitted a film project to the producers based on the youth character with a spirit of emancipation as expressed in the song.

"Je vole" is performed on the soundtrack of the film by Louane (full name Louane Emera), a singer in Top 8 of season 2 of the French The Voice: la plus belle voix picked for the lead actress in the film.

The text of the song was slightly changed but the general meaning and even phraseology were kept. Only the refrain is kept intact word for word. Another striking difference is that the whole song is sung by Louane, whereas in the original, Sardou spoke the lyrics and only sings the refrain. Several other songs of Sardou are also used in the soundtrack for the film.

Weekly charts

Year-end charts

Certifications

References

1978 singles
2014 songs
1978 songs
Michel Sardou songs
Songs written by Michel Sardou
Songs written by Pierre Billon